i am a good person/i am a bad person is a 2011 Canadian drama film written and directed by Ingrid Veninger. Veninger decided at short notice to make the film while on a trip to Europe to show another title, Modra. The film loosely incorporates aspects of Veninger's own life; the film within a film is called Modra as is Veninger's movie in real life, Veninger herself plays the lead character who is a filmmaker, like herself, and the filmmaker's daughter, Sara, is played by Veninger's real life daughter Hallie Switzer.

Plot
Filmmaker Ruby White (Ingrid Veninger) sets off on a European tour of her latest film, Headshots, taking her daughter Sara (Hallie Switzer) with her as her assistant. The first screening does not go well, playing to a nearly empty theatre. After Ruby goes out partying late at night a disgruntled Sara decides to abandon their trip to Berlin to go stay with her cousin Lili in Paris.

In Berlin Ruby dresses herself in a bandage with fake blood in order to promote her film Headshots with limited success. While going out for a drink a stranger approaches her and asks if she is a good person or a bad person. Inspired by the comment Ruby makes a sign that on one side declares that she is a good person and on the other declares she is a bad person. Wandering in a park in Berlin she asks the question to various strangers she meets.

Meanwhile in Paris Sara confirms she's pregnant by her boyfriend and Skypes him with the news. She visits Père Lachaise Cemetery with an old actor friend of her mother's where she recounts that her mother was pregnant with her while filming in the cemetery and almost had a miscarriage. She then goes to get an infinity symbol tattoo.

At the Berlin screening of her film Ruby is again confronted with a near empty audience. In the pre-screening introduction to her film she reveals that she made the film because she is no longer in love with her husband and she hoped he would see the film and realize that.

At the Paris airport Sara calls her boyfriend and tells him that she is not ready to have a baby but that she does love him. She meets up with her mother in order to head home and sitting in their seats waiting for their flight to take off, the two women hold hands.

Cast
 Ingrid Veninger as Ruby
 Simon Reynolds as Doug
 Jacob Switzer as Jake
 Hallie Switzer as Sara
 James Glyn as Bradford Greeter
 Suzana Mikytova as Lili
 Mathieu Chesneau as Luke

Notes

References

External links
 

2011 films
2011 drama films
Canadian drama films
English-language Canadian films
Films directed by Ingrid Veninger
2010s English-language films
2010s Canadian films